The 2010–11 Egyptian Premier League is the fifty-fourth season of the Egyptian Premier League since its establishment in 1948. It began on 5 August 2010 and ended on 11 July 2011. The league was suspended on 27 January 2011 due to the Egyptian Revolution and resumed on 13 April 2011. A total of 16 teams are contesting the league including six-time defending champions Al-Ahly S.C. who have won thirty-five times in total.

Teams 
Ghazl El-Mehalla, El Mansoura SC and Asyut Petroleum as the worst three teams of the 2009–10 were relegated to the 2010–11 Egyptian Second Division. They were replaced by the three 2009–10 Egyptian Second Division champions, Wadi Degla, Smouha and Misr El-Maqasha.

Stadiums and locations

Personnel and sponsoring

League table

Results

Top goalscorers

See also
Egypt Cup
Egyptian Super Cup
List of football clubs in Egypt
Cairo derby

References

External links
2010–11 Egyptian Premier League on soccerway.com
RSSSF

1
1
Egypt